Never Say Die: Live is a live album by Waylon & The Waymore Blues Band, released on Sony Records through the Lucky Dog imprint in 2000. Jennings' third live album – after Waylon Live (1976) – and his last record of original material to be released during his lifetime, it was recorded at Nashville's historic Ryman Auditorium on January 5 and 6, 2000. At that time, Jennings was battling both emphysema and severe diabetes that had forced him to give up the sort of long tours he had always done. The album is credited to "Waylon & The Waymore Blues Band", referring to the singer's backing band, actually a mix of many of his original road band, the Waylors, and additional musicians. The album features a host of guests, including Waylon's wife Jessi Colter and three artists then on Sony: Montgomery Gentry, John Anderson and Travis Tritt. The songs themselves are a mix of original Jennings hits, tracks from his more recent albums and compositions he had never covered. Like 1998's Closing in on the Fire, Never Say Die: Live reached #71 on the country charts. The original 2000 release did not by any means constitute the complete concert, which ran an hour and forty minutes and was recorded by Sony in video. On July 24, 2007, Legacy Recordings, the Sony BMG reissue specialists, released the complete concert including all twenty-two tracks on two CDs and on DVD as well.

Track listing
"Closing in on the Fire" (Tony Joe White) – 5:17
"Waymore's Blues" (Jennings, Curtis Buck) – 3:38
"Never Say Die" (Jennings) – 5:06
"Amanda" (Bob McDill) / "A Couple More Years" (Shel Silverstein, Dennis Locorriere) – 6:40
"Drift Away" (Mentor Williams) – 3:54
"Nothing Catches Jesus by Surprise" (Jennings, Tom Douglas) – 4:26
"Good Hearted Woman" (Jennings, Willie Nelson) – 3:36
"I'm Not Lisa" (Jessi Colter) – 3:12
"Storms Never Last" (Jessi Colter) – 3:39
"Never Been to Spain" (Hoyt Axton) – 5:28
"I'm a Ramblin' Man" (Ray Pennington) – 2:52
"Goin' Down Rockin'" (Tony Joe White, Leann White) – 5:31
"I've Always Been Crazy" (Jennings) – 4:19
"Can't You See" (Toy Caldwell) – 5:19

Personnel
Waylon Jennings - electric guitar, lead vocals
 Ritchie Albright - drums
 Jerry Bridges - bass guitar
 Jessi Colter - piano, vocals
 Jim Horn - flute, alto saxophone, tenor saxophone
 Barny Robertson - keyboards, vocals
 Carter Robertson - vocals
 Charles Rose - trombone
 Robby Turner - acoustic guitar, steel guitar, mandolin, vocals
 Rance Wasson - electric guitar, vocals
 Reggie Young - electric guitar
 Jenny Lynn - electric violin, cello

Chart performance

References

Waylon Jennings albums
Albums produced by Blake Chancey
2000 live albums
Columbia Records live albums